Jonathan Inguito Taconing (born 12 January 1987) is a Filipino boxer. He is a former light flyweight champion of the Oriental and Pacific Boxing Federation, and the current International light flyweight champion of the World Boxing Council, a title he already once held in his career, from 2010-2012. He and Mark Magsayo were named the Most Promising Boxers of the Year at the 2016 Elorde Boxing Awards. Taconing is trained by former Filipino professional boxer Eddie Ballaran and under the management of Johnny Elorde.

As of July 2019, Taconing is ranked no. 1 in the WBC Light Flyweight Division.

Early years
Taconing started boxing at age 14 in amateur boxing. He fought 30 amateur bouts earning PhP 500.00, around USD 10.00, per fight. He decided to fight professionally after seeing boxing legend Manny Pacquiao beats Fahsan "3k Battery" of Thailand in 2007.

He is with a common-law wife Marybeth Francisco-Taconing and has three children.

Notable fights 
Taconing vs Porpramook
Jonathan Taconing lost a highly controversial fight against then WBC Light Flyweight Champion Kompayak Porpramook in Buriram, Thailand. Referee stopped the fight at the end of the 5th round due to a cut on Porpramook after an accidental clash of heads in the previous round.

WBC reviewed the performance of the South Korean referee Jae-Bong Kim and as a result suspended Kim for one year.

Taconing vs Hirales
Jonathan Taconing TKO Ramon Garcia Hirales in a one-sided fight on 04 April 2015 in Metepec, Mexico, Mexico, gaining the WBC No. 1 ranking. Referee stopped the fight at 2:53 on the 10th and final round.

Taconing vs Lopez
July 02, 2016 Jonathan Taconing lost another title fight for the second time against the WBC Light Flyweight Champion Ganigan Lopez in  Arena Coliseo, Mexico City, Mexico. All judges score the bout 115-112, 118-109, 119-108 with a unanimous decision win for Lopez.

Professional boxing record

Titles 
 OPBF Light Flyweight Champion (108 lbs)
 WBC International Light Flyweight Champion (108 lbs) (3x)

References

Filipino male boxers
Light-flyweight boxers
1987 births
Living people
People from Zamboanga del Norte
Sportspeople from Zamboanga del Norte